Lillian "Lilly" Alice Hiatt (born April 26, 1984) is an American, Nashville, Tennessee-based singer-songwriter. She is the daughter of singer-songwriter John Hiatt.

Early life and education 
Hiatt was born in Los Angeles, California. Her father is singer-songwriter John Hiatt and her mother was film sound editor Isabella Wood. Wood was Hiatt's second wife. Wood, who was at that time separated from John Hiatt, died from suicide when her daughter was almost one year old.

Hiatt grew up in Nashville, Tennessee, on a farm with her father, his third wife Nancy Stanley Hiatt, older brother Rob, and younger sister Georgia Rae.

Hiatt has played music since she was 12, when her father gave her her first guitar, a 1953 parlor-size Martin.

In 2006, Hiatt graduated from the University of Denver with a degree in psychology.

Career 
In 2005, Hiatt formed a band, Shake Go Home, in Denver with fellow students from University of Denver. After graduation, the band moved to Nashville and recorded several EPs. Band members included Hiatt, Eric Knutson on guitar, Jeff Montoya on bass, and John Arrotti on drums. Hiatt relocated briefly to Austin, Texas, but returned to Nashville in 2013.

In 2012, Hiatt released her debut album, Let Down. The record was produced by Doug Lancio (Patty Griffin, Matthew Ryan, Todd Snider).

In 2015, Hiatt released her second album, Royal Blue, on the Normaltown label, an imprint of New West. The record was produced by Nashville producer Adam Landry (Deer Tick, Rayland Baxter, Middle Brother), and was recorded using analog recording technology. Hiatt employed synthesizer as well as pedal steel, and broadened the scope of her style to reflect her musical influences.

Hiatt's band that she recorded her first two records with was called Lilly Hiatt and the Dropped Ponies, and included guitarist Beth Finney, drummer Jon Radford, bass player Jake Bradley, and Luke Schneider on pedal steel.

In 2016, at a mansion in East Nashville, the Luck Reunion organization gathered pairs of musicians to collaborate on songs for a series of 45 rpm singles recorded using analog equipment provided by Third Man Records. Hiatt together with Aaron Lee Tasjan recorded two songs: Guy Clark's "Dublin Blues" and John Prine's "Angel from Montgomery"

In August 2017, Hiatt released her third album, Trinity Lane. The record was produced by Michael Trent of Shovels & Rope and was recorded on Johns Island in South Carolina. Cary Ann Hearst of Shovels & Rope appears on vocals on the track "Everything I Had." The record's title comes from a main street in East Nashville in Tennessee. Hiatt said that although the songs often have a dark subject matter, the record is a rock and roller.

Hiatt used a new band on her album, Trinity Lane. The band members are John Condit on guitar, Robert Hudson on bass, and Allen Jones on drums.

Hiatt has toured with Aaron Lee Tasjan, John Moreland, Drive-by Truckers, Margo Price, and John Prine, as well as many others.

Personal life 
Hiatt lives in East Nashville, Tennessee. She struggled with addiction and became sober in her late 20s.

Discography

Solo albums
 2012: Let Down (Normaltown Records)
 2015: Royal Blue (Normaltown Records)
 2017: Trinity Lane (New West Records)
2020: Walking Proof (New West Records)
2021: Lately (New West Records)

Singles
 2017: Luck Mansion Sessions (Third Man Records) with Aaron Lee Tasjan – songs: "Dublin Blues" and "Angel from Montgomery"

Also appears on
 2008: John Hiatt – Same Old Man (New West)
 2011: Across Tundras – Sage (Neurot)
 2012: Ronnie Fauss – I Am the Man You Know I'm Not (Normaltown)

Awards and nominations

References

External links

 
 
 
 

1984 births
Living people
American women singer-songwriters
21st-century American singers
American singer-songwriters
American rock musicians
American rock singers
Women rock singers
21st-century American women singers